Kings Sutton railway station serves the village of King's Sutton in Northamptonshire, England.  It is also one of the nearest railway stations to the town of Brackley. The station is managed by Chiltern Railways, who provide most of the services,  including from London Paddington and Marylebone to Oxford and Banbury.

History
The Great Western Railway built the  —  section of the Oxford and Rugby Railway between 1845 and 1850. However, the GWR did not open a station at King's Sutton until 1872. By 1881 the arrival of the Banbury and Cheltenham Direct Railway via  had made King's Sutton a junction. British Railways withdrew passenger services between King's Sutton and Chipping Norton in 1951 and closed the B&CDR line to freight traffic in 1964. The station was reduced to an unstaffed halt from 2 November 1964.
BR removed King's Sutton station footbridge in the 1960s and replaced it with a signal-controlled barrow crossing at the North end of the platform. An incident in early 2005 where a passenger was nearly hit by an express train saw the Northbound platform closed for a short period whilst security guards were brought in to man the crossing. This led to work starting on the bridge in late 2005 and completion in May 2006. 
The old passenger shelter on the up platform was replaced by a new plastic and metal 'bus-shelter' style one.

A late night robbery in 2001 led Chiltern Railways to raise security concerns. As a result, CCTV cameras were installed in 2002.

King's Sutton is the least used station in the county of Northamptonshire.

Routes and operators

Services at King's Sutton are operated by Chiltern Railways and Great Western Railway.

Chiltern Railways also operate a single late evening service between Oxford and Banbury via the Cherwell Valley Line.

A limited Sunday service (3 trains per day) operates on this route during the summer months only.

Gallery

References

External links

 Least Used Station in Northamptonshire via YouTube

Railway stations in Northamptonshire
DfT Category F2 stations
Former Great Western Railway stations
Railway stations in Great Britain opened in 1873
Railway stations served by Chiltern Railways
Railway stations served by Great Western Railway